State Route 164 (SR 164) is a state highway in the northeastern part of the U.S. state of Georgia. It is entirely within Banks County.

Route description
SR 164 begins at an intersection with SR 51 in Homer. It curves to the southeast, to an intersection with SR 98 before leaving town. Southeast of Homer is a brief concurrency with US 441. The route continues to the southeast, crossing over, but not intersecting Interstate 85 (I-85), before meeting its eastern terminus, an intersection with SR 59, which leads to an interchange with I-85.

History

The original route of SR 164 was commissioned as a three-mile (5 km) long connector in Banks County in the 1940s and extended in the early 1960s into Franklin County east to SR 106 along Bold Springs Road. The original route joined US 441/SR 15 to SR 59, serving as a cutoff between Homer and Carnesville. While the 1960s extension was retracted back to its original eastern terminus around 1989, the highway was extended again in late 2004 westward along Old US 441 as part of a business route into Homer to join SR 51.

Major intersections

See also

References

External links

 Georgia Roads (Routes 161 - 180)

164
Transportation in Banks County, Georgia